Big Muddy may refer to:

Places
Big Muddy, Wyoming, U.S.
Big Muddy Badlands, Saskatchewan, Canada, and Montana, U.S.

Waterways
Big Muddy Creek (Missouri River tributary), Saskatchewan, Canada, and Montana, U.S.
Missouri River, nicknamed "Big Muddy"
Mississippi River, nicknamed "The Big Muddy"
Big Muddy River, Illinois, U.S.
Big Muddy Creek (New Zealand), near the Upper Nihotupu Reservoir
Big Muddy Lake, a lake in Saskatchewan

Other uses
 Big Muddy (film), a 2015 Canadian crime drama
 Big Muddy National Fish and Wildlife Refuge, along the Missouri River, U.S.
 Big Muddy oil field, Wyoming, U.S.
 Big Muddy Ranch Airport, Antelope, Oregon, U.S.
 Big Muddy Records, an independent American music record label
 Big Muddy River Correctional Center, in Ina, Jefferson County, Illinois
 Weyburn-Big Muddy, an electoral district in Saskatchewan, Canada
 "Big Muddy", a song by Bruce Springsteen from the 1992 album Lucky Town

See also
 "Waist Deep in the Big Muddy", a 1967 anti-war song by Pete Seeger